The 1966–67 season of the European Cup Winners' Cup club football competition was won by Bayern Munich with a 1–0 final victory over Rangers, who had eliminated holders Borussia Dortmund. It was the fourth time in six years that the final required at least extra time to decide the winners.

Preliminary round 

|}

First round

|}

First leg

Second leg

Braga won 4–2 on aggregate.

Raba ETO Győr won 4–3 on aggregate.

Strasbourg won 2–1 on aggregate.

Second round

|}

First leg

Second round

Slavia Sofia won 2–1 on aggregate.

Quarter-finals

|}

Semi-finals 

|}

First leg

Second leg

Bayern Munich won 5–1 on aggregate.

Rangers won 2–0 on aggregate.

Final

See also
 1966–67 European Cup
 1966–67 Inter-Cities Fairs Cup

External links 
 1966-67 competition at UEFA website
 Cup Winners' Cup results at Rec.Sport.Soccer Statistics Foundation
 Cup Winners Cup Seasons 1966-67–results, protocols
 website Football Archive 1966–67 Cup Winners Cup

3
UEFA Cup Winners' Cup seasons